Not Dead Yet (NDY) is a United States disability rights group that opposes assisted suicide and euthanasia for disabled people. Diane Coleman, JD, is the founder and president of this national group. Stephen Drake, a research analyst with NDY, is one of the group's chief spokespersons and contacts for press releases.

In 2004, NDY protested against the removal of Terri Schiavo's feeding tube. It also protested against the movie Million Dollar Baby, in which the injection of an overdose of epinephrine to euthanize a suicidal quadriplegic woman is depicted as a rational and compassionate act. The group has been highly critical of utilitarian philosophers such as Peter Singer of Princeton University.  Coleman has called Professor Singer "the most dangerous man on earth" and asserted that he was advocating genocide. In June 2015, NDY organized protests against Singer's position that new-born babies with certain disabilities can morally be killed, which he sees as no different from abortion. The 2015 protest happened because Singer had recently advocated that expensive treatments should be withheld from disabled babies to save the healthcare system money; Not Dead Yet’s first protest against Singer happened at Princeton University after it hired Singer in 1998. Both times the protesters called for Princeton University to dismiss Singer.

See also
Care Not Killing, a similar group in the United Kingdom
Right to die

References

External links
Official website
Not Dead Yet UK
noassistedsuicideny.org

Disability rights organizations
Health and disability rights organizations in the United States
Assisted suicide
Euthanasia in the United States
Terri Schiavo case
Non-profit organizations based in New York (state)
Organizations established in 1996